This is the discography of Violent Femmes, a Milwaukee, Wisconsin-based alternative rock group, which consists of ten studio albums, 19 singles, five live albums and four compilation albums, in addition to a number of miscellaneous appearances on soundtracks and compilations featuring various artists. This list does not include solo material by any of the bands' members.

Violent Femmes was formed in 1980 by vocalist/guitarist Gordon Gano, bassist Brian Ritchie and drummer Victor DeLorenzo, finding immediate success with the release of their self-titled debut album in early 1983. Featuring "Blister in the Sun", "Kiss Off", "Add It Up" and "Gone Daddy Gone", Violent Femmes became the band's biggest-selling album and was eventually certified platinum by the RIAA. Although the sales success of their debut was never matched, The Blind Leading the Naked (1986), 3 (1988), Why Do Birds Sing? (1991) and New Times (1994) all peaked at higher chart positions on the Billboard 200. Throughout their career, Violent Femmes' popularity remained consistent, especially in Australia where four of their albums made the Top 40 and the debut stayed on the charts for seven months. The songs "Nightmares" and "American Music" cracked the top five on the US Modern Rock Tracks chart. In 2009, Gano released a statement announcing the bands' break-up. However, Violent Femmes reformed in 2013, and released We Can Do Anything (their first studio album in 16 years) in 2016.

Albums

Studio albums

Live albums

Compilation albums

EPs

Singles

Retail singles

Promotional singles

Music videos

Video albums

Soundtracks and compilations

References

Discographies of American artists
Rock music group discographies
Discography